Mistawasis Nêhiyawak ( mistawâsis nêhiyawak) is a Cree First Nation band government in Leask, Saskatchewan, Canada. Their settlement is roughly sixty-eight kilometres west of Prince Albert. The Nation has one reserve with an area of approximately 125.44 square kilometres.

The First Nation has a registered population of 2171 people as of November 2005 . Approximately 1036 members of the First Nation live on-reserve, and approximately 1135 live off-reserve.

The First Nation is affiliated with the Saskatoon Tribal Council, along with six other First Nations.

The First Nation takes its name from the name of its first chief, Chief Mistawasis. Mistawasis, or "Big Child" in English, was the first person to sign Treaty 6 in 1876.

Notable people of the Mistawasis Nation include Marion Buller, a judge in British Columbia who heads the National Inquiry into Missing and Murdered Indigenous Women.

Reserves
Mistawasis Nêhiyawak has reserved for itself 12 reserves:

 Mistawasis 103
 Mistawasis 103A
 Mistawasis 103B
 Mistawasis 103C
 Mistawasis 103D
 Mistawasis 103E
 Mistawasis 103F
 Mistawasis 103G
 Mistawasis 103H
 Mistawasis 103I
 Mistawasis 103J
 Mistawasis 103L

References

External links

Cree governments
First Nations governments in Saskatchewan